The 2012–13 Western Sydney Wanderers FC season was the club's inaugural season since its establishment in 2012. The club participated in the A-League for the first time, winning the competition and finishing as runner-up in the 2013 A-League Grand Final.

Season overview
On 4 April 2012, Western Sydney Wanderers was established by FFA as a Western Sydney based club to compete in the A-League. On 17 May, Tony Popovic was announced as inaugural head coach. Popovic joined the club on a four-year deal after requesting to be released from the final year of his contracted role as assistant manager of Crystal Palace. On 22 May, Ante Milicic joined the club as assistant coach. On 25 June, the first players to sign to the new club were announced, these were Aaron Mooy from St Mirren, Tarek Elrich from Newcastle Jets and Kwabena Appiah-Kubi from Central Coast Mariners. All three players signed a one-year contract, as would all players in the inaugural squad, with exception of two (Beauchamp and Ono). On 30 June, Sydney players Michael Beauchamp, Mark Bridge and Shannon Cole, as well as Nikolai Topor-Stanley from Newcastle Jets FC all signed for the club. Beauchamp was the first player to sign past the inaugural season, with a three-year contract. On 2 July, Ante Čović joined the squad from Melbourne Victory and Labinot Haliti joined from Newcastle Jets. On 25 July, after just two months of developing a squad, the club played its first friendly match against local club, Nepean. The game ended in a 0–5 win for Wanderers, with Haliti scoring one and Gibbs scoring four in front of a crowd of 3,500. On 31 July, Adam D'Apuzzo signed to the new club from APIA Leichhardt Tigers. On 2 August, Jerrad Tyson joined the squad from Gold Coast United, Jason Trifiro joined the squad from South Melbourne and Reece Caira joined from Aston Villa. On 8 August, Tahj Minniecon joined the squad from Gold Coast United. On 13 August, Dino Kresinger joined the squad from Cibalia and Mateo Poljak joined from Dinamo Zagreb. On 21 August, Jérome Polenz joined the squad from Union Berlin. On 11 September, Iacopo La Rocca joined the squad from Grasshoppers and Youssouf Hersi joined from Alki Larnaca. On 28 September, Japanese midfielder Shinji Ono became the club's International Marquee player, signing to the club for two years from J. League Division 1 team Shimizu S-Pulse. On 3 October, Joey Gibbs joined the squad from Marconi Stallions FC.

On 6 October, Western Sydney Wanderers played their first competitive match of any kind against Central Coast Mariners in the first round of the A-League season. The match, played in front of a home crowd, ended in a 0–0 draw. On 12 October, Wanderers lost to Adelaide United by a score of 1–0. On 20 October, Wanderers lost to Sydney by a score of 0–1 in front of a sell out crowd in the first ever Sydney Derby match. On 22 October, Wanderers defeated Brisbane Roar 0–1 with Bridge scoring to secure the team's first competitive win of any kind. On 2 November, Wanderers defeated Melbourne Heart 2–1 at home with a goal from Bridge and an own goal from Gerhardt. On 10 November, Wanderers lost to Newcastle Jets by a score of 1–2 with Gibbs providing the only goal. On 18 November, a 10-manned Wanderers defeated Perth Glory 0–1 with Hersi sent off on the 38th minute after a goal scored by La Rocca. On 24 November, Wanderers lost to Melbourne Victory by a score of 0–2. On 2 December, Wanderers lost to Wellington Phoenix by a score of 1–0. On 9 December, Wanderers defeated Brisbane Roar 1–0 with a goal by Ono. On 15 December, Wanderers defeated Sydney 0–2 in the second Sydney Derby match of the season, with goals from Hersi and Beauchamp. On 21 December, Wanderers defeated Adelaide United 6–1 with a hat-trick from Bridge, as well as goals from Kresinger, Ono and Gibbs. On 27 December, Wanderers drew against Perth Glory 1–1 with a goal by Haliti.

On 1 January 2013, Wanderers defeated Melbourne Victory 2–1 with Ono scoring both goals. The result saw Wanderers overtake Melbourne Victory for third place in the league. On 3 January, defenders Adam D’Apuzzo and Shannon Cole extended their contracts with the club for a further one year until 2014. On 6 January, a ten manned Wanderers lost to Central Coast Mariners by a score 0–2 with Trifiro sent off early in the second half. On 9 January, Rocky Visconte signed a short-term contract with the club until the end of the season. On 13 January, Wanderers bounced back with a 0–2 win over Wellington Phoenix with Topor-Stanley and Haliti scoring. On 20 January, Wanderers continued their winning ways, defeating Brisbane Roar 1–2 with goals from Bridge and Hersi. On 26 January, Wanderers defeated Melbourne Heart 1–0 with a goal by Ono after Polenz was sent off early in the first half. On 3 February, Wanderers defeated Adelaide United 2–4 with goals by from Hersi and one each from Bridge and Poljak. On 9 February, Wanderers defeated Newcastle Jets 2–1 with two goals from Hersi and Bridge. The win took Wanderers to second place in the league. On 16 February, Wanderers defeated Melbourne Victory 1–2 with goals from La Rocca and Ono. On 23 February, Wanderers defeated Perth Glory 1–0 with a goal by Mooy. On 2 March, Wanderers defeated Central Coast Mariners 0–1 with a goal by Haliti. The win saw Wanderers overtake Central Coast Mariners for first place in the league. On 7 March, Josh Barresi signed to the club on a two-year first team professional contract as an injury replacement for Tahj Minniecon. On 10 March, Wanderers defeated Wellington Phoenix 2–1 with Ono and Bridge both scoring penalty kicks to set an A-League record of nine straight match wins. On 16 March, Wanderers defeated Melbourne Heart 1–3 with two goals from Haliti and one from La Rocca. On 22 March, goalkeeper Carlos Saliadarre signed a short-term contract with Wanderers from Blacktown Spartans until the end of the season as an injury replacement for Jerrad Tyson. On 23 March, Wanderers broke their 10-game winning streak after a 1–1 draw against Sydney in the third Sydney Derby match of the season in front of a sold out crowd. Cole scored Wanderers only goal shortly after Sydney received a red card, with La Rocca also receiving a red card later in the game. On 29 March, Wanderers ended their debut A-League season on a high after defeating Newcastle Jets 0–3 with two goals from Bridge and one from Visconte. The win secured Wanderers first place in the league, with the team winning the Premiers' Plate, as well as an A-League Finals position and a 2014 AFC Champions League spot.

On 12 April, Wanderers defeated Brisbane Roar 2–0 at home in the semi-final match of the A-League Finals, to secure a place in the Grand Final. Kresinger and Ono supplied the goals before Hersi was sent off after receiving a second yellow card. On 21 April, Wanderers played against Central Coast Mariners in the 2013 A-League Grand Final. The match, played at Sydney Football Stadium in front of a full crowd, saw Wanderers lose 0–2.

Players

Squad information

Transfers in

Technical staff

Statistics

Squad statistics

Goal scorers

Pre-season and friendlies

Competitions

Overall

A-League

League table

Results summary

Results by round

Matches

Finals series

See also
 2012–13 Western Sydney Wanderers W-League season

References

External links
 Official Website

Western
Western Sydney Wanderers FC seasons